Oedaleonotus is a genus of spur-throated grasshoppers in the family Acrididae. There are about nine described species in Oedaleonotus.

Species
 Oedaleonotus borckii (Stål, 1860)
 Oedaleonotus enigma (Scudder, 1876) (valley grasshopper)
 Oedaleonotus orientis Hebard, 1920
 Oedaleonotus pacificus (Scudder, 1881)
 Oedaleonotus phryneicus Hebard, 1919
 Oedaleonotus pinctus (Scudder, 1899)
 Oedaleonotus tenuipennis (Scudder, 1897)
 Oedaleonotus truncatus Rehn, 1907
 Oedaleonotus werneri Yin and Smith, 1989

References

Further reading

 
 

Melanoplinae